Monroe Carnegie Library, also known as Old Monroe Carnegie Library, is a historic Carnegie library located at Bloomington, Monroe County, Indiana.  It was built in 1917, and is a one-story, rectangular, Neoclassical style limestone building on a raised basement.  The Monroe County History Center is a history museum the historic library building that was established as a Carnegie library. The museum is located on the site of Center School in the former Bloomington Public Library building. The library building is now home to the Monroe County Historical Society, their collection of artifacts, and their Genealogy Library. A historical marker is present at the site. The History Center is located at 202 East 6th Street. It is a tourist attraction.

The building measures approximately 50 feet by 40 feet, and has a two-story concrete block addition built in 1955.  It features arched windows and a projecting arched entryway topped by a pagoda style roof.  It was constructed with a $31,000 grant from the Carnegie Foundation.  It was listed on the National Register of Historic Places in 1978.

The Monroe County Public Library vacated the building in 1970; by 1978 and through the 1980s it was used by various nonprofits. On April 27th of 1985 Glenn Danzig's Deathrock band Samhain (band) performed there during their Unholy Passion EP tour. Since 1994, the former library houses the Monroe County Historical Society.

References

Carnegie libraries in Indiana
History museums in Indiana
Libraries on the National Register of Historic Places in Indiana
Neoclassical architecture in Indiana
Library buildings completed in 1917
Buildings and structures in Bloomington, Indiana
National Register of Historic Places in Monroe County, Indiana